Lope Díaz de Haro may refer to:

 Lope Díaz I de Haro (1105-1170)
 Lope Díaz II de Haro Cabeza Brava (1170-1236)
 Lope Díaz III de Haro (d. 1288)
 Lope Díaz de Haro - Lord of Orduña and Balmaseda (d. 1322)

See also 
 Diego López de Haro (disambiguation)
 House of Haro